Jaguaruna is a municipality in the state of Santa Catarina in the South region of Brazil.

The city is served by Humberto Ghizzo Bortoluzzi Regional Airport.

See also
List of municipalities in Santa Catarina

References

Municipalities in Santa Catarina (state)